Fredsan Marshall (born 26 December 1994), is an Indian professional footballer who plays as a midfielder or winger for I-League club Sreenidi Deccan.

Club career
Born in Goa, Marshall began his career as part of the Brazil Football Academy before joining the Dempo under-20 side. He then played for local side Vasco before joining the Goa side for Premier Futsal in 2016.

Churchill Brothers
For the 2018–19 season, Marshall joined I-League club Churchill Brothers. He made his professional debut for the club on 28 October 2018 against Punjab FC.

Marshall scored his first professional goal for Churchill Brothers on 5 March 2021 against Real Kashmir. His second half stoppage goal was the winner in a 2–1 victory.

Career statistics

Club

References

External links
Profile at the All India Football Federation website

1994 births
Living people
People from Goa
Indian footballers
Association football midfielders
Dempo SC players
Vasco SC players
Churchill Brothers FC Goa players
I-League players
Footballers from Goa
Sreenidi Deccan FC players